The action of 30 September 1681 was a 2-hour fight that took place on 30 September 1681 near Cape St Vincent, and was a victory for the Spanish over Brandenburg, which suffered 10 dead and 30 wounded.

The Action 
The Brandenburg squadron, mistakenly believing to have encountered a Spanish convoy of merchant ships returning fully laden with precious metals, spices, and luxuries from the Americas, attacked the far superior Spanish warship squadron that had been sent out in search of the suspected raiders, but retreated into the safety of the Portuguese port of Lagos when their mistake became clear. While the Branderburgers repaired their damage in Lagos, the Spanish merchant convoy safely slipped into Cádiz.

Ships involved

Spain
12 ships
3 fireships

Brandenburg (Adlers)
Markgraf von Brandenburg 50 guns (formerly Spanish Carolus Secundus, captured the previous year)
Fuchs 20 guns
Rother Löwe 20  guns
Einhorn 12 guns
Prinzess Maria 12 guns
Wasserhund 10 guns

Total : 6 ships, 124 guns.

References

Action of 30 September
Naval battles involving Spain
Naval battles involving Brandenburg
1681 in Europe
Battles involving Brandenburg-Prussia